Parish is an upcoming American crime drama television series based on the BBC One series The Driver. It is set to premiere on AMC in 2023.

Cast

Main 
Giancarlo Esposito as Gracián “Gray” Parish
Arica Himmel as Michaela
Paula Malcomson as Ros
Ivan Mbakop as Zenzo
Bonnie Mbuli as Shamiso Tongai
Zackary Momo as The Horse
Dax Rey as Luke
Skeet Ulrich as Colin

Recurring 
Bradley Whitford as Anton
Caleb Baumann as Maddox Parish

Production
It was announced on March 8, 2022 that a television series adaptation of the BBC One series, The Driver, was in development, with Giancarlo Esposito starring as Vince. On June 23, 2022, it was announced that Paula Malcomson had joined the cast as Ros. In July, it was announced that Arica Himmel, Ivan Mbakop, Zackary Momo and Dax Rey had joined the cast as Michaela, Zenzo, the Horse and Luke, respectively. In August, it was announced that Bonnie Mbuli and Skeet Ulrich had joined the cast as Shamiso Tongai and Colin, respectively. 

The series is created by Danny Brocklehurst and Sunu Gonera with Theo Travers acting as showrunner and is executive produced by Brocklehurst, Esposito, Gonera and Travers, alongside Josh Kesselman, David Morrissey and Danny Sherman. Filming is set to begin in early August of 2022 in New Orleans. The same month, the title for the series was announced to be Parish. In October 2022, it was reported that Gonera was removed from the series following an internal investigation against him.

References

External links

AMC (TV channel) original programming
2020s American crime drama television series
American television series based on British television series
English-language television shows
Television shows filmed in New Orleans
Upcoming drama television series
Works about taxis